Michael Matheson (born February 27, 1994) is a Canadian professional ice hockey defenceman for the  Montreal Canadiens of the National Hockey League (NHL). Matheson was drafted by the Florida Panthers in the first round, 23rd overall, of the 2012 NHL Entry Draft.

Playing career
As a youth, Matheson played in the 2006 and 2007 Quebec International Pee-Wee Hockey Tournaments with a minor ice hockey team from the West Island. He began his junior career in the Quebec Midget AAA league playing with the Lac St. Louis Lions from 2009 to 2011. Matheson then left to join the Dubuque Fighting Saints of the United States Hockey League (USHL), where he led all defencemen in scoring in 2011–12. He then committed to play for Boston College of the NCAA starting in 2012–13. He cited his motivation for leaving his native Quebec was the ability to develop better as a player in the USHL and in the NCAA. Following his freshman year at Boston College, Matheson was named to Hockey East's All-Rookie Team. For his sophomore campaign, Matheson earned All-First Team honours in the Hockey East conference as well as All-Second Team East Honors in the NCAA as determined by the AHCA.

Matheson decided on April 30 to remain at Boston College for the 2014–15 season amid rumours of his leaving school to sign with the NHL team that drafted him, the Florida Panthers. On May 8, he was named team captain for the 2014–15 season. At the conclusion of the 2014–15 season, Matheson signed an entry-level contract with the Panthers, forgoing his senior year of NCAA eligibility, and was sent to play with the Panthers' American Hockey League (AHL) affiliate, the San Antonio Rampage.

Matheson made his NHL debut on March 23, 2016, in a 3–1 win over the Winnipeg Jets. He recorded his first career NHL goal the following season on October 18, 2016, against the Tampa Bay Lightning.

On October 7, 2017, the Panthers signed Matheson to an eight-year, $39 million contract extension worth $4.875 million annually. On October 13, 2018, during a game against the Vancouver Canucks, Matheson checked Canucks forward Elias Pettersson, resulting in Pettersson leaving the game with a concussion. While Matheson was not penalized for the play on the ice, the NHL Department of Player Safety believed that Matheson had an intent to injure, resulting in him suspension two games, thereby forfeiting $52,419.36 in salary. Following the incident, Matheson said, "I know deep down there was no frustration in me when that play happened and there was no intent to injure on my part;" he apologized to Pettersson via text.

On September 24, 2020, Matheson was traded by the Panthers to the Pittsburgh Penguins, along with Colton Sceviour, in exchange for Patric Hörnqvist.

On July 16, 2022, Matheson, along with a 2023 fourth-round draft pick, was traded to the Montreal Canadiens in exchange for Jeff Petry and Ryan Poehling. The trade reunited Matheson with his former agent Kent Hughes, who had become general manager of the Canadiens in January of 2022. Expected to become the team's top defenceman, Matheson was considered to have performed strongly in the preseason games lead up to the 2022–23 season, but developed an abdominal muscle strain while participating in a Kraft Hockeyville game. It was announced that he would miss the first eight weeks of the season. He made his debut in the team's eighteenth game of the season on November 19, registered a goal and an assist in a 5–4 shootout win over the Philadelphia Flyers.

Personal life
Matheson met his wife Emily Pfalzer, an American professional hockey player and Olympic gold medalist, while both were playing at Boston College. The two became engaged in the summer of 2018 and married on July 20, 2019. Their son, Hudson, was born in 2021.

Career statistics

Regular season and playoffs

International

Awards and honours

References

External links

1994 births
AHCA Division I men's ice hockey All-Americans
Anglophone Quebec people
Boston College Eagles men's ice hockey players
Canadian expatriate ice hockey players in the United States
Canadian ice hockey defencemen
Dubuque Fighting Saints players
Florida Panthers draft picks
Florida Panthers players
Living people
Montreal Canadiens players
National Hockey League first-round draft picks
People from Pointe-Claire
Pittsburgh Penguins players
Portland Pirates players
San Antonio Rampage players